Parmish Verma (born 3 July 1990) is an Indian singer, rapper, director and actor associated with the Punjabi Music and Punjabi Film Industry. He started his career as a video director then singer, and later debuted as an actor with the film Rocky Mental.

Career
Parmish started his career as a director with zimmewari bhukh te doori which was the story of an adolescent boy based on the life of Verma where he described the hard time which he faced while living in Australia and about the advice given to him by Gurikk Maan.

Verma debuted as an actor from the movie Rocky Mental in 2017. He also acted in the lead role in movies like Dil Diyan Gallan (2019) which he also wrote and directed.  Later he released more movies such as "Singham, and most recently, Jinde Meriye.

Personal life
Verma was born in Patiala, in a Punjabi Hindu Khatri family to Satish Verma, a theatre artist and writer, and Paramjit Verma, a professor.

Parmish was shot by Punjab gangster Dilpreet Baba in Mohali on his way back home from a party, which he later recovered. 

He married his longtime girlfriend Canadian politician Guneet Grewal on 20 October 2021. On 30 September 2022 they had a daughter named Sadaa.

Directed music videos 

Parmish has directed several music videos for various artists like Sharry Mann, Ninja, Akhil, Mankirat Aulakh and Dilpreet Dhillon Mohammed Mehabin . Most of them are filmed in Chandigarh and Mohali . Below are only few selected videos directed by Parmish Verma.

Discography

As singer

Filmography

References 

21st-century Indian male singers
21st-century Indian singers
Living people
1990 births